Facundo Andrés Castillón (born 21 August 1986) is an Argentine footballer who plays as a winger or forward.

Career

Early career
Born in Rosario, Santa Fe, Castillón finished his formation with Argentino de Rosario. He made his senior debut for the club, appearing in Primera C.

In 2006 Castillón joined Tiro Federal, freshly relegated to Primera B Nacional. He was a regular starter for the club during the following four seasons, scoring a career-best five goals in the 2009–10 season.

On 7 July 2010, Castillón signed for Club Olimpo, newly promoted to Primera División. He made his debut in the category on 8 August, starting in a 1–2 away loss against Banfield.

On 31 July 2011, Castillón moved to Godoy Cruz also in the first division. He scored his first goal in the main category on 27 September, netting the equalizer in a 1–1 draw at Newell's Old Boys.

Racing Club
In August 2014, Castillón agreed to a contract with fellow league team Racing Club, for a 10 million pesos fee. He made his debut for the club 10 August, in a 3–1 win at Defensa y Justicia, and scored his first goal in a 2–0 home success over San Lorenzo seven days later.

After being rarely used during the 2015 campaign, Castillón was loaned to Banfield until the end of the year. He was subsequently loaned to Gimnasia La Plata and later to Spanish side Getafe.

Honours 
Racing Club
Primera División: 2014

References

External links
 
 
 

1986 births
Living people
Footballers from Rosario, Santa Fe
Argentine footballers
Association football forwards
Argentine Primera División players
Primera Nacional players
Segunda División players
Super League Greece 2 players
Tiro Federal footballers
Olimpo footballers
Godoy Cruz Antonio Tomba footballers
Racing Club de Avellaneda footballers
Club Atlético Banfield footballers
Club de Gimnasia y Esgrima La Plata footballers
Getafe CF footballers
Club Atlético Lanús footballers
Aldosivi footballers
Levadiakos F.C. players
Nueva Chicago footballers
Atlético de Rafaela footballers
Argentine expatriate footballers
Argentine expatriate sportspeople in Spain
Argentine expatriate sportspeople in Greece
Expatriate footballers in Spain
Expatriate footballers in Greece